John Herbert Dudley Ryder, 5th Earl of Harrowby (22 August 1864 – 30 March 1956), briefly known as Viscount Sandon from March to December 1900, was a British peer and Conservative Member of Parliament. Harrowby was the son of Henry Dudley Ryder, 4th Earl of Harrowby, and Susan Juliana Maria Hamilton Dent.

Career
He was educated at Trinity College, Cambridge. In 1898 He was elected to the House of Commons for Gravesend, a seat he held until 1900 when he succeeded his father in the earldom and entered the House of Lords. From 1927 to 1948 he held the honorary post of Lord Lieutenant of Staffordshire. He worked at Coutts bank, was deputy Lieutenant for Staffordshire; also lieutenant for the Staffordshire Yeomanry.

Marriage
Lord Harrowby married Mabel Danvers Smith, daughter of William Henry Smith and Emily Danvers, Viscountess Hambleden, in 1887. As a result of her marriage, Mabel Ryder was styled as Countess of Harrowby effective 11 December 1900.

Mabel, Countess of Harrowby, was named Dame Commander of the Order of the British Empire (DBE) in 1919. She died on 27 March 1956.

Death
He died in March 1956, only three days after his wife, aged 91, and was succeeded in his titles by his sole surviving child, his son, Dudley.

References

Work cited

External links
 

1864 births
1956 deaths
Alumni of Trinity College, Cambridge
Chancellors of Keele University
Conservative Party (UK) MPs for English constituencies
Earls of Harrowby
English justices of the peace
Lord-Lieutenants of Staffordshire
Sandon, John Ryder, Viscount
Sandon, John Ryder, Viscount
Harrowby, E5
John